Moscow City Duma District 16 is one of 45 constituencies in Moscow City Duma. The constituency has covered parts of Eastern Moscow since 2014. From 1993-2005 District 16 also was based in Eastern Moscow, but covered more areas to the south-east of its current configuration; however, after the number of constituencies was reduced to 15 in 2005, the constituency was eliminated. The constituency was recreated in 2009, and for 5 years it covered parts of Western and North-Western Moscow.

Members elected

Election results

2001

|-
! colspan=2 style="background-color:#E9E9E9;text-align:left;vertical-align:top;" |Candidate
! style="background-color:#E9E9E9;text-align:left;vertical-align:top;" |Party
! style="background-color:#E9E9E9;text-align:right;" |Votes
! style="background-color:#E9E9E9;text-align:right;" |%
|-
|style="background-color:"|
|align=left|Sergey Loktionov (incumbent)
|align=left|Independent
|
|49.22%
|-
|style="background-color:"|
|align=left|Yury Nazarov
|align=left|Communist Party
|
|18.42%
|-
|style="background-color:"|
|align=left|Aleksandr Molokhov
|align=left|Independent
|
|17.17%
|-
|style="background-color:#000000"|
|colspan=2 |against all
|
|10.85%
|-
| colspan="5" style="background-color:#E9E9E9;"|
|- style="font-weight:bold"
| colspan="3" style="text-align:left;" | Total
| 
| 100%
|-
| colspan="5" style="background-color:#E9E9E9;"|
|- style="font-weight:bold"
| colspan="4" |Source:
|
|}

2009

|-
! colspan=2 style="background-color:#E9E9E9;text-align:left;vertical-align:top;" |Candidate
! style="background-color:#E9E9E9;text-align:left;vertical-align:top;" |Party
! style="background-color:#E9E9E9;text-align:right;" |Votes
! style="background-color:#E9E9E9;text-align:right;" |%
|-
|style="background-color:"|
|align=left|Yevgeny Gerasimov (incumbent)
|align=left|United Russia
|
|67.01%
|-
|style="background-color:"|
|align=left|Andrey Chupanov
|align=left|Communist Party
|
|14.79%
|-
|style="background-color:"|
|align=left|Aleksandr Basmanov
|align=left|A Just Russia
|
|7.75%
|-
|style="background-color:"|
|align=left|Maksim Gromov
|align=left|Liberal Democratic Party
|
|6.80%
|-
| colspan="5" style="background-color:#E9E9E9;"|
|- style="font-weight:bold"
| colspan="3" style="text-align:left;" | Total
| 
| 100%
|-
| colspan="5" style="background-color:#E9E9E9;"|
|- style="font-weight:bold"
| colspan="4" |Source:
|
|}

2014

|-
! colspan=2 style="background-color:#E9E9E9;text-align:left;vertical-align:top;" |Candidate
! style="background-color:#E9E9E9;text-align:left;vertical-align:top;" |Party
! style="background-color:#E9E9E9;text-align:right;" |Votes
! style="background-color:#E9E9E9;text-align:right;" |%
|-
|style="background-color:"|
|align=left|Anton Molev
|align=left|Independent
|
|45.85%
|-
|style="background-color:"|
|align=left|Denis Parfenov
|align=left|Communist Party
|
|19.32%
|-
|style="background-color:"|
|align=left|Mikhail Timonov
|align=left|A Just Russia
|
|14.04%
|-
|style="background-color:"|
|align=left|Yelena Grishchenko
|align=left|Yabloko
|
|10.53%
|-
|style="background-color:"|
|align=left|Nikolay Lazarev
|align=left|Liberal Democratic Party
|
|4.50%
|-
|style="background-color:"|
|align=left|Marat Mustafin
|align=left|Independent
|
|2.31%
|-
| colspan="5" style="background-color:#E9E9E9;"|
|- style="font-weight:bold"
| colspan="3" style="text-align:left;" | Total
| 
| 100%
|-
| colspan="5" style="background-color:#E9E9E9;"|
|- style="font-weight:bold"
| colspan="4" |Source:
|
|}

2019

|-
! colspan=2 style="background-color:#E9E9E9;text-align:left;vertical-align:top;" |Candidate
! style="background-color:#E9E9E9;text-align:left;vertical-align:top;" |Party
! style="background-color:#E9E9E9;text-align:right;" |Votes
! style="background-color:#E9E9E9;text-align:right;" |%
|-
|style="background-color:"|
|align=left|Mikhail Timonov
|align=left|A Just Russia
|
|36.40%
|-
|style="background-color:"|
|align=left|Anton Molev (incumbent)
|align=left|Independent
|
|30.85%
|-
|style="background-color:"|
|align=left|Aleksandra Andreyeva
|align=left|Communist Party
|
|17.34%
|-
|style="background-color:"|
|align=left|Tatyana Gordiyenko
|align=left|Communists of Russia
|
|4.34%
|-
|style="background-color:"|
|align=left|Vera Kosova
|align=left|Liberal Democratic Party
|
|4.13%
|-
|style="background-color:"|
|align=left|Aleksandra Andreyeva
|align=left|Independent
|
|3.82%
|-
| colspan="5" style="background-color:#E9E9E9;"|
|- style="font-weight:bold"
| colspan="3" style="text-align:left;" | Total
| 
| 100%
|-
| colspan="5" style="background-color:#E9E9E9;"|
|- style="font-weight:bold"
| colspan="4" |Source:
|
|}

Notes

References

Moscow City Duma districts